Applebee is a surname. Notable people with the surname include:

Caroline Maria Applebee (–1854), English artist
Constance Applebee (1873–1981), US-based English academic athletic director
Frank W. Applebee (1902–1988), American painter
Kelly Applebee (born 1982), Australian cricketer

See also
Applebee's, American restaurant company

Given names